Jan Leschly (born 11 September 1940) is a Danish businessman and former professional tennis player. He was a semi finalist in the men's singles at the 1967 U.S. National Championships, and a quarter finalist in doubles at the1966  Wimbledon Championships. Between 1957 and 1973 he won 18 career titles in singles.

Tennis career
He was a tour tennis professional from the late the 1950s to the early 1970s. In July 1957 won his played and won his first title the East of England Championships on grass at Felixstowe. Between 1959 and 1971 he participated in nine Wimbledon Championships and achieved his best result in 1966 when he reached the fourth round of the singles event and, partnering with his countryman Jørgen Ulrich (uncle of Lars Ulrich whose father is Torben Ulrich), the quarterfinals of the doubles event.
Jan Leschly was in the semifinal of the US Championship at Forest Hills in 1967, where he lost to Clark Graebner in five sets.
He was ranked World No. 10 for 1967 in Lance Tingay amateur rankings for The Daily Telegraph. In 1972 won his last title at the Scandinavian Indoor Championships played on carpet courts at Copenhagen. In 1973 played his final tournament at the Coast Championship at Rungsted where he lost in the semi finals to Lars Elvstrom.

Career finals

Singles 33 (18-15)

Work career
Leschly has been the chairman and chief executive officer of Care Capital LLC, a private equity firm, since May 2000.
Other positions:
Chief Executive and Director, SmithKline Beecham, a company that develops and markets pharmaceuticals and over-the-counter medicines, 1994 to May 2000. 
Director, American Express, Viacom, Maersk, and Dynavax Technologies Corporation. 
Member, Advisory Board of Daimler Chrysler and the Emory University Business School Dean's Advisory Council.

References

External links
 
 
 
 Kubulus Alumni – Jan Leschly at Københavns Universitet
 

1940 births
American Express people
Danish healthcare chief executives
Danish male tennis players
Living people
Private equity and venture capital investors
Place of birth missing (living people)
20th-century Danish people